Sphere Within Sphere (Sfera con sfera) is a bronze sculpture by Italian sculptor Arnaldo Pomodoro.

Versions of the sculpture (diameters vary) can be seen in many settings worldwide, including:

See also
 United Nations Art Collection
 List of public art in Washington, D.C., Ward 2

References

External links
flickr.com

European sculpture
Modernist sculpture
Bronze sculptures
Sculpture series
Bronze sculptures in the United States
Sculptures of the Smithsonian Institution
Hirshhorn Museum and Sculpture Garden
Outdoor sculptures in Washington, D.C.
Bronze sculptures in Japan
United Nations art collection
Sculptures of the Vatican Museums